= Results of the 1900 Canadian federal election =

Outcome of the 1900 Canadian Federal Election

1900 Canadian federal election

== Results by Province ==
=== British Columbia ===
Results in British Columbia
Party	Seats	Second	Third	Votes	%	+/-
Liberals	4	1	2	12,985	49.09	
Conservative	2	3	1	10,814	40.88	
Labour	0	1	0	2,652	10.03	
Total	6			26,451	100.0	

=== Manitoba ===
Results in Manitoba
Party	Seats	Second	Votes	%	+/-
Liberals	2	4	17,907	42.93	
Conservative	3	2	14,716	35.28	
Independent	1	1	5,650	13.54	
Independent Labour	1	0	3,441	8.25	
Total	7		41,714	100.0	

=== New Brunswick ===
Results in New Brunswick
Party	Seats	Second	Third	Votes	%	+/-
Liberals	9	5	0	35,401	51.86	
Conservative	3	7	0	24,278	35.56	
Liberal–Conservative	2	0	0	5,499	8.06	
Independent Conservative	0	1	0	2,861	4.19	
Independent	0	0	1	228	0.33	
Total	14			68,267	100.0	

=== Northwest Territories ===
Results in Northwest Territories
Party	Seats	Second	Votes	%	+/-
Liberals	4	0	13,012	55.09	
Conservative	0	4	10,606	44.91	
Total	4		23,618	100.0	

=== Nova Scotia ===
Results in Nova Scotia
Party	Seats	Second	Third	Votes	%	+/-
Liberals	15	3	2	54,384	51.7	
Conservative	5	14	0	47,206	44.88	
Liberal–Conservative	0	0	1	3,604	3.43	
Total	20			105,194	100.0	

=== Ontario ===
Results in Ontario
Party	Seats	Second	Third	Fourth	Votes	%	+/-
Liberals	34	50	3	0	199,616	46.73	
Conservative	47	32	1	0	191,692	44.87	
Liberal–Conservative	7	0	0	0	16,420	3.84	
Independent Conservative	1	2	0	0	7,220	1.69	
Independent	2	1	1	1	7,058	1.65	
Independent Liberal	1	1	1	0	4,895	1.15	
Labour	0	0	2	0	272	0.06	
Total	92				427,173	100.0	

=== Prince Edward Island ===
Results in Prince Edward Island
Party	Seats	Second	Votes	%	+/-
Liberals	3	2	10,887	51.78	
Conservative	1	3	8,285	39.4	
Liberal–Conservative	1	0	1,854	8.82	
Total	5		21,026	100.0	

=== Quebec ===
Results in Quebec
Party	Seats	Second	Third	Fourth	Votes	%	+/-
Liberals	57	9	0	0	133,566	56.28	
Conservative	8	55	2	0	103,356	43.55	
Independent	0	0	4	0	371	0.16	
Unknown	0	0	0	1	27	0.01	
Total	65				237,320	100.0	
